Shapes of Things is a double LP compilation album of songs by English rock group the Yardbirds.  It was released by Charly Records on 12 September 1977, the first of many Yardbirds compilations on the label. It features selections produced by Giorgio Gomelsky that were recorded between 1964 and 1966.

The album marks the first UK release of the group's influential "The Train Kept A-Rollin'" and the first album appearance of the instrumental "Steeled Blues".  Demos for four songs later recorded for the group's post-Gomelsky album, Yardbirds (also known as Over Under Sideways Down and Roger the Engineer), are also included.

Shapes of Things, released in Canada by Bomb Records, reached number 96 on the RPM Top 100 album chart in 1978. Charly Records also used the same title for a comprehensive seven-LP collection of Gomelsky-produced material released in 1984.

Track listing

References

The Yardbirds compilation albums
Albums produced by Giorgio Gomelsky
1977 compilation albums
Charly Records compilation albums